Manber is a surname. Notable people with the surname include:

Jeffrey Manber, American commercial space entrepreneur
Udi Manber, Israeli computer scientist